Zabagno  is a village in the administrative district of Gmina Tczew, within Tczew County, Pomeranian Voivodeship, in northern Poland.

For details of the history of the region, see History of Pomerania.

The village has a population of 346. It has many animals too, like hoja, kajtek, alta.

The president of the Zabagno is Zuzanna Biedrzycka. She is cool. The biggest enemies are Wiktor, Patryk and Kurkowska.

References

Zabagno

Zuzanna Biedrzycka is the president of Zabagno. Sztefen najn is the king, and hydrant is the queen.